North Eastern Electric Power Corporation Limited (NEEPCO) is
a central public sector undertaking. It is under the ownership of Ministry of Power, Government of India. It was formed on 2 April 1976 to plan, investigate, design, construct, generate, operate and maintain power stations in the North Eastern Region of India.
NEEPCO is conferred with the Schedule A- Miniratna Category-I CPSU status.

Venture
NEEPCO is embarking on a plan to generate power from non-conventional sources of energy, especially by tapping solar power and wind in the coming years. Current capacity of NEEPCO is 2057 MW (2021).

NTPC Limited takeover
On 21 November 2019, the Government of India approved the take over of North Eastern Electric Power Corporation Limited (NEEPCO) by NTPC Limited.

See also
 Kopili Hydro Electric Project
 Ranganadi Dam

References

Government agencies established in 1976
Electric-generation companies of India
1976 establishments in Meghalaya
Companies based in Meghalaya